The Good Brothers are a Canadian country, bluegrass and folk music group originating from Richmond Hill, Ontario. The band's core members are Brian Good (guitar), his twin brother Bruce Good (autoharp) and younger brother Larry Good (banjo).

Brian and Bruce Good initially joined guitarist James Ackroyd to form the band James and the Good Brothers in 1967. Their self-titled album was released on Columbia Records in 1971. After a tour itinerary throughout North America, including a Toronto concert opening  for Grand Funk Railroad, the Goods wished to return to Canada while Ackroyd sought to continue in the United States.

In 1973, younger brother Larry Good joined the twins to form a new band which first performed 14 May 1974 in Toronto at The Riverboat club. Since then, the band has extensively toured Canada, United States and Europe. Their role in Canadian music was strengthened by winning the Juno Award for Country Group or Duo for eight consecutive years from 1977 to 1984.

In 1980, the group signed to Solid Gold Records. Their first two singles were covers - Van Morrison's Brown Eyed Girl, and Ace's How Long. While the latter single failed to chart, its b-side, an original song called Hot Knife Boogie, from their Live LP, recorded at Toronto's Horseshoe Tavern (as were both sides of the former single) and featuring The Powder Blues Band, was popular on college campus radio stations, and received some play on FM rock stations like Toronto's Q107. It would later be included on their 2008 compilation LP, Restricted Goods

The Good Brothers have been supplemented by other musicians over the years, such as John P. Allen (fiddle) and Bruce's son Travis Good of The Sadies (guitar and mandolin). Travis was a regular member of The Good Brothers when Larry took a leave of absence throughout the 1990s, this lineup used the alternate name "The Goods".  Bruce and Larry were joined by Bruce's wife Margaret Good, Brian's daughter D'arcy Good, and all of The Sadies to record and perform live as "The Good Family" in 2013.  

The 1988 single entitled "You Won't Fool This Fool This Time" was written by Bernie LaBarge. It reached No. 14 on the Canadian country charts.

The Good Brothers reached a younger generation of fans when Pat Burns (then coach of the Toronto Maple Leafs hockey team) joined them on-stage to play some music. Burns also played guitar on one of their albums.

In 1996 the Good Brothers provided entertainment at the Queen's Park Provincial Legislature's Canada Day celebrations in Toronto, Ontario.

In 2003 the Good Brothers performed at the Palmer Rapids Twin Festival, in Palmer Rapids, Ontario.

In 2006 the band released a gospel album, Blind Faith, and then headed out on their 29th tour of Europe.

Discography

Albums

Singles

References

External links

The Good Brothers official site
The Canadian Encyclopedia: The Good Brothers
CMT: The Good Brothers profile
Jam!: The Good Brothers
Paquin Entertainment (management): The Good Brothers profile

Musical groups established in 1972
Canadian country music groups
Canadian folk music groups
Juno Award winners
Musical groups from the Regional Municipality of York
Richmond Hill, Ontario
RCA Records artists
Canadian twins
1972 establishments in Ontario